The South American Basketball Championship 1961 was the 18th edition of this regional tournament. It was held from April 20 to April 30 in Rio de Janeiro, Brazil. Eight teams competed.

Results
The final standings were determined by a round robin, where the 8 teams played against each other once.

References
FIBA Archive

1961
Championship
International basketball competitions hosted by Brazil
Basketball
International sports competitions in Rio de Janeiro (city)
20th century in Rio de Janeiro
South American Basketball Championship